The Adventures of Jimmy Neutron: Boy Genius: Jet Fusion is a video game released in 2003 based on the CGI animated TV series The Adventures of Jimmy Neutron, Boy Genius as well as the television film, Operation: Rescue Jet Fusion. In the game, the player controls Jimmy Neutron who has to save the movie star/spy Jet Fusion by using a variety of gadgets and inventions.

Plot
Jimmy has an assignment to write a book report, and decides to invent the Virtual World Reproduction Machine (VWRM), a device that will show the class what the book is about like a movie. Jimmy places his Jet Fusion book into the machine and it malfunctions, thus turning Retroville into a virtual world. Then Professor Calamitous kidnaps Jet Fusion and it's up to Jimmy to save him. Throughout the game, the player has to collect pieces for major and minor inventions, which help Jimmy continue to the next level. The one major invention in each level helps defeat the boss in the boss level, while the one minor invention in each world helps Jimmy battle his enemies and various obstacles. The minor inventions also come with a primary and secondary action.

Reception

The game received "mixed or average" reviews, according to according to review aggregator Metacritic. GameRankings gave it a score of 63% for the GameCube version, 50.75% for the PlayStation 2 version, and 57.80% for the Game Boy Advance version; while Metacritic gave it a score of 60 out of 100 for the GameCube version, 50 out of 100 for the PS2 version, and 61 out of 100 for the GBA version.

References

2003 video games
Action-adventure games
GameCube games
3D platform games
PlayStation 2 games
Game Boy Advance games
Jet Fusion
Krome Studios games
Video games developed in Australia
THQ games
Video games developed in the United States
Single-player video games